Ioannis Athinaiou (alternate spellings: Giannis, Yiannis, Yannis, Athineou, Athinaioy) (born May 27, 1988) is a Greek professional basketball player and the team captain for Karditsa of the Greek Basket League. He is 1.94 m (6 ft 4  in) tall. and 96 kg (212 lbs). He can play at both the point guard and shooting guard positions.

Youth career
At a young age, Athinaiou began playing youth system basketball in Greece. He started playing with the youth teams of Poseidonas, a club that is located in Psychiko, Athens.

Professional career
Athinaiou first played professionally with the Greek clubs Ilysiakos Athens, Panionios Athens, and KAOD. In the summer of 2009, he signed a 4-year contract with Panionios. He joined the Greek League club Aris Thessaloniki, in 2013.

Athinaiou joined the Italian League club Olimpia Milano, in 2014. In May, he parted ways with the team. He signed with the Greek EuroLeague team Olympiacos Piraeus, in 2015. With Olympiacos, he won the Greek League championship in 2016. He returned to Aris Thessaloniki, for the 2017–18 season. 

On July 29, 2018, Athinaiou signed a two-year contract with Aris' arch-rivals, PAOK Thessaloniki. In January 2019, he joined the French League club Fos Provence.

On August 12, 2019, Athinaiou  moved to the Greek EuroLeague club Panathinaikos Athens. After joining Panathinaikos, Athinaiou became the first player in history to be a member of all five of the largest Greek basketball teams, having been a member of Panathinaikos, Olympiacos, AEK, PAOK and Aris. However, just a few days later, Athinaiou unfortunately suffered a torn ACL knee injury, in one of the Greek national team's preparation games against Serbia, just two weeks prior to the start of 2019 FIBA World Cup. As a result of the injury, Athinaiou missed the entirety of the following COVID-19 pandemic shortened 2019–20 season.

On July 16, 2020, Athinaiou signed with the Greek club Peristeri. On December 17, however, he was released from Peristeri after the acquisition of Vangelis Mantzaris. The following day, Athinaiou signed with Promitheas Patras, in an unofficial "swap" between the two teams. On April 17, 2021, Athinaiou agreed to move to Spanish club RETAbet Bilbao Basket for the rest of the season, replacing the injured Jonathan Rousselle.

On August 6, 2021, Athinaiou signed with Ionikos. In 18 games, he averaged 9 points, 3.2 rebounds and 4.4 assists, playing around 25 minutes per contest.

National team career
Athinaiou was a member of the Greek university national team. He played at the 2007 World University Games. He has also been a member of the senior Greek national basketball team. He played with Greece at the 2016 Turin FIBA World Olympic Qualifying Tournament. He also played at the 2019 FIBA World Cup qualification, where he had a game-winning buzzer-beating 3 pointer against Great Britain.

Awards and accomplishments
 Greek League All-Star: (2014)
 2x Greek League Champion: (2016, 2020)

References

External links
 FIBA Profile
 Euroleague.net Profile
 Eurobasket.com Profile
 Greek Basket League Profile 
 Greek Basket League Profile 
 Italian League Profile 
 Hellenic Basketball Federation Profile 
 Draftexpress.com Profile

1988 births
Living people
AEK B.C. players
Aris B.C. players
Bilbao Basket players
Eskişehir Basket players
Fos Provence Basket players
Greek men's basketball players
Ilysiakos B.C. players
Ionikos Nikaias B.C. players
K.A.O.D. B.C. players
Olimpia Milano players
Olympiacos B.C. players
Panathinaikos B.C. players
Panionios B.C. players
Peristeri B.C. players
Promitheas Patras B.C. players
P.A.O.K. BC players
Point guards
Shooting guards
Basketball players from Athens